2011 Irish elections may refer to:

Republic of Ireland
2011 Irish general election
2011 Irish presidential election

Northern Ireland
2011 Northern Ireland Assembly election
2011 Northern Ireland local elections